Samson Kitur (February 25, 1966 — April 25, 2003) was a Kenyan athlete, and an Olympic medalist in 1992.

Biography
Unlike most of his compatriots, who run in distances 800 metres and up, Kitur specialised in the 400 metres. He won the continental championship in 1991, and the next year he took the bronze medal at the 1992 Summer Olympics, behind winner Quincy Watts. A year later, another bronze medal was his at the World Championships in Stuttgart.

He died suddenly of an unspecified illness at age 37 in his home in Eldoret, his home Kerotet Village near Ziwa.

Two of his brothers were also Olympic athletes: Simon Kitur and David Kitur.

External links

Sports-reference profile

1966 births
2003 deaths
Kenyan male sprinters
Athletes (track and field) at the 1990 Commonwealth Games
Athletes (track and field) at the 1992 Summer Olympics
Athletes (track and field) at the 1996 Summer Olympics
Olympic athletes of Kenya
Olympic bronze medalists for Kenya
Commonwealth Games medallists in athletics
World Athletics Championships medalists
Medalists at the 1992 Summer Olympics
Olympic bronze medalists in athletics (track and field)
Commonwealth Games gold medallists for Kenya
Commonwealth Games silver medallists for Kenya
African Games gold medalists for Kenya
African Games medalists in athletics (track and field)
Athletes (track and field) at the 1995 All-Africa Games
Athletes (track and field) at the 1991 All-Africa Games
World Athletics Indoor Championships medalists
Medallists at the 1990 Commonwealth Games